is a Japanese lawyer who served as the 18th Chief Justice of the Supreme Court of Japan.

Early life and education
Terada was born in Kyoto, Kyoto Prefecture, Japan. He was born into a family of great judicial significance. His father, Jirō Terada, was the Supreme Court's 10th Chief Justice. In 1972, he graduated from the University of Tokyo, Faculty of Law.

By 1980, Terada had held various positions as Assistant Judge in several District Courts, the Tokyo District Court in 1974, the Sapporo District Court in 1977 and the Osaka District Court in 1980. Terada was also the Ambassador of Japan to the Netherlands in 1981. He then moved to the Ministry of Justice in 1988, where he served as the Director-General of the Judicial System Department and the Civil Affairs Bureau.

Before becoming Chief Justice, Terada was the President of the Hiroshima High Court and was also one of the Justices of the Supreme Court.

Chief Justice
At age 66, Terada replaced Hironobu Takesaki as Chief Justice on April 1, 2014, when Takesaki reached the date of his retirement.

Terada as Chief Justice, was formally appointed by the Emperor after being nominated by the Cabinet; which in practice, is known to be under the recommendation of the former Chief Justice.
It was the first time since the ratification of the Japanese Constitution in 1947, that a father and son have both held the top judiciary position.

He retired on January 8, 2018, when he reached the mandatory retirement age of 70.

Honours
:
 Grand Cordon of the Order of the Paulownia Flowers (2019)
 :
 Knight Grand Cross of the Order of Orange-Nassau (29 October 2014)

References

External links
Official Website 
Official Profile 
Profile History 

Chief justices of Japan
Living people
University of Tokyo alumni
1948 births
People from Kyoto
Japanese judges